The Free School of Evanston  was an alternative school that existed in Evanston, Illinois, 
United States from 1971 to 1976, for five school years.

Influences
The Free School was influenced by Summerhill School. At meetings, parents, students, and teachers were all equal, each having one vote. Tuition was based on a sliding scale percentage of parents' income. The school did not pursue educational accreditation.

Location
The school rented space at:

Student body
The school enrolled more than 100 students, aged 5–16, divided into lower, middle, and upper age groups. Most were from the Chicago suburbs, with a few from Chicago's inner city neighborhoods.

Principals

See also
Anarchistic free school
Alternative education
Student voice

References

Defunct schools in Illinois
Schools in Evanston, Illinois
Democratic free schools
Educational institutions established in 1971
Educational institutions disestablished in 1976
Underground culture
1971 establishments in Illinois
1976 disestablishments in Illinois